Tunisian Canadians are Canadians of Tunisian descent or Tunisians who have Canadian citizenship.

Most Tunisian Canadians speak Arabic, French or English. According to the 2016 Census there were 25,645 Canadians who claimed Tunisian ancestry.

See also
 Moroccan Canadians
 Algerian Canadians
 Canada–Tunisia relations
 Arab Canadians
 Tunisian Americans

References

External links 

 

Arab Canadian
Tunisian emigrants to Canada
Canadian
African Canadian